The Grand Prix Cycliste de Saguenay is a bicycle stage race held annually in Saguenay, Quebec. It is part of the UCI America Tour, as a 2.2 category event. It was formed in 2014 after the previous Coupe des nations Ville Saguenay – a race reserved to riders between 19 and 22 of age and rated 2.Ncup by the UCI between 2008 and 2013 – was removed from the UCI Nations Cup calendar.

The Grand Prix Cycliste de Saguenay is held in the same area, but is now open to trade teams.

Results

References

External links

UCI America Tour races
Cycle races in Canada
Sport in Saguenay, Quebec
Recurring sporting events established in 2014
2014 establishments in Quebec